The CMLL-Reina International Championship (Campeonato Internacional del CMLL-Reina in Spanish;  in Japanese) was a women's professional wrestling championship promoted by Consejo Mundial de Lucha Libre (CMLL) and Reina Joshi Puroresu. When the title was created, it was first called the Reina-CMLL International Championship, but the names of the promotions have since been switched around in the title's name.

History
Universal Woman's Pro Wrestling Reina held a tournament to crown the first champion on August 26, 2012, involving four wrestlers from Consejo Mundial de Lucha Libre of Mexico and Reina of Japan.

Title history

List of combined reigns

Championship tournament
The tournament to crown the inaugural Reina-CMLL International Champion took place on August 26, 2012. The finals saw Leon defeat Tiffany to become the inaugural champion.

References 

Consejo Mundial de Lucha Libre championships
Women's professional wrestling championships